Sydney Egere, (born 26 January 1996), known as Sydney Talker, is a Nigerian media personality, comedian and actor.He is the founder and CEO of Neville Records, and nominated for the 25 Under 25 Award organized by SME100 Africa.

Early life and education 
Born in Edo State, Nigeria and raised by a single mum, Sydney Talker had his primary and secondary education in Benin. He then went on to acquire a Bachelor's Degree in Computer Science from the University of Benin.

Career 
Sydney Talker's career started in 2016. He started off by creating and uploading comedy skits on his social media handles, especially Instagram. His comedy skit 'The Poor Power Supply was what brought him to limelight in 2016. He was nominated in the 2020 edition of the 25 Under 25 Awards organized by SME100 Africa. Sydney has also starred in several Nollywood movies alongside popular Nollywood actors and actresses..He was dubbed as the Nigerian mr Bean-The Towel Guy.

In January 2022, Sydney Talker announced the launch of his record label, Neville Records' in an Instagram post. He also unveiled his first signing Khaid on the same day., and also Bad Mout which a comedy club.

Filmography

Criticism 
Sydney Talker has been criticized on social media for conniving with fellow skit maker, Carter Efe to claim ownership of Berri Tiga's song by trying to pay him off.

References

External links 
 

Living people
Nigerian male comedians
People from Edo State
University of Benin (Nigeria) alumni
Nigerian music industry executives
1995 births
21st-century Nigerian male actors
Nigerian male actors